Special Areas of Conservation in Northern Ireland are part of the European Union's Natura 2000 network of sites with special flora or fauna.

Northern Ireland has 54 SACs:

See also 
Special Area of Conservation
Special Protection Area

References

Northern Ireland coast and countryside
Special Areas of Conservation in Northern Ireland
 
Norrn Iron